Vainona High School is a high school in a suburb called Vainona, near Borrowdale, Zimbabwe.

History 
Vainona High School accepted its first 150 pupils in January 1974.

The founder-head-master was Mr. William (Bill) A. Staude.
Current Head is Mr. A. Mhene who took over from the Headmistress Mrs. N. Chinamasawho had taken over from Mrs B Sibanda who had retired aged 65. Mrs. B. Sibanda replaced the Mr. D P Makanza who died in June 2013.
Previous headmaster L Nhembe died in April 2022. Mr Mugumwa is now the senior master alongside the senior woman Mrs Chinamasa.

Notable alumni 
Many famous Zimbabwe sports personalities attended Vainona High School. 
 
 
 Andy Flower, the Zimbabwean cricket player, before he moved to St Georges
 Takudzwa Ngwenya – Plays for the USA (Eagles) and Biarritz in France.

Educational institutions established in 1974
High schools in Zimbabwe
Schools in Harare
1974 establishments in Rhodesia